Pericharaxis was an inland town of ancient Mysia. Its name does not occur in ancient authors but is attested by epigraphic evidence.

Its site is located near Kadı Kale Çay in Asiatic Turkey.

References

Populated places in ancient Mysia
Former populated places in Turkey